Soul Bird: Whiffenpoof is an album by Latin jazz vibraphonist Cal Tjader recorded in 1965 and released on the Verve label.

Reception

The Allmusic review by  Alex Henderson awarded the album 3 stars stating, "it's an enjoyable demonstration of the vibist's ability to be a bit more commercial than usual and still maintain his bop-based integrity".

Track listing
 "The Whiffenpoof Song" (Tod Galloway, Meade Minnigerode, George S. Pomeroy) - 2:04
 "Soul Bird (Tin Tin Deo)" (Gil Fuller, Dizzy Gillespie, Chano Pozo) -  2:41
 "How High the Moon" (Nancy Hamilton, Morgan Lewis) - 4:08
 "That's All" (Bob Haymes, Alan Brandt) - 2:04
 "Soul Motion" (Lonnie Hewitt) - 3:10
 "Reza" (Rey Guerra, Edu Lobo) - 4:10
 "The Prophet" (Cal Tjader) - 3:01
 "Sonny Boy" (Lew Brown, Buddy DeSylva, Ray Henderson) - 3:32
 "Doxy" (Sonny Rollins) - 4:21
 "Samba de Orfeu" (Luiz Bonfá) - 2:01
 "Shiny Stockings" (Frank Foster) - 2:33
 "Daddy Wong Legs" (Tjader) - 3:41    
Recorded at A & R Studios in New York City on June 1 & 2 (tracks 1, 5, 6, 9 & 12), and at Van Gelder Studio in Englewood Cliffs, NJ on June 22 (tracks 2-4, 7, 8, 10 & 11), 1965

Personnel
Cal Tjader - vibraphone
Paul Griffin (tracks 1, 5, 6, 9 & 12), Lonnie Hewitt  (tracks 2-4, 7, 8, 10 & 11) - piano
Richard Davis (tracks 1, 5, 6, 9 & 12), John Hilliard (tracks 2-4, 7, 8, 10 & 11) - bass
Grady Tate (tracks 1, 5, 6, 9 & 12), Johnny Rae  (tracks 2-4, 7, 8, 10 & 11) - drums 
Armando Peraza - percussion

References

Verve Records albums
Cal Tjader albums
1965 albums
Albums produced by Creed Taylor
Albums recorded at Van Gelder Studio